The 2001–02 season was Blackpool F.C.'s 94th season (91st consecutive) in the Football League. They competed in the 24-team Division Two, then the third tier of English league football, finishing sixteenth.

John Murphy and Brett Ormerod were the club's joint-top scorers, with twenty goals each in all competitions. Ormerod achieved this feat despite being sold to Southampton for a Blackpool club-record £1.75million in November.

Table

References

2001-02
Blackpool